Paul Adams (born 22 December 1949) is an English former cricket umpire.

A schoolmaster by profession, Adams began officiating in county cricket in the Minor Counties Championship in 1987. He first officiated in List A one-day matches in 1991, when he stood at Canterbury in the match between Kent and Cambridgeshire in the NatWest Trophy. Adams officiated in List A matches until 2002, standing in 12 matches in the NatWest Trophy (and from 2001, its successor the Cheltenham & Gloucester Trophy), in addition to standing in one match between first-class counties in the 2001 Norwich Union League.

In addition to standing in List A matches, Adams also stood in 23 first-class matches from 1992 to 2002, following in invitation to join the first-class reserve umpires list for 1992. The matches he stood in typically involved touring sides playing county opponents, or Oxford and Cambridge Universities. None of the 23 first-class matches that he stood in were in the County Championship. Besides umpiring in men's cricket, Adams also umpired in a Women's One Day International between England and Australia at Derby in 2001. He was the headmaster of St Ignatius' College in Enfield, before retiring in 2007.

References

External links
Paul Adams at Cricket Archive 

1949 births
Living people
People from East Ham
Schoolteachers from Essex
English cricket umpires